Victor Claude Alexandre Fanneau de Lahorie (Javron-les-Chapelles; 5 January 1766 - Paris; 29 October 1812) was a French general, conspirator against Napoleon, and godfather of Victor Hugo.

Biography
Victor Fanneau de La Horie served the First French Republic in the Army of the Rhine with Joseph Hugo and became close friends with the younger man. He was the godfather and namesake of Joseph's son Victor Hugo. He served in the revolutionary armies, but souring on Napoleon joined the Moreau conspiracy. When the plan fell apart in 1801, he was proscribed and went into hiding on the estate of Joseph Hugo. There the young Victor Hugo got to know the general.

After fleeing abroad, he returned to France in 1808 and was arrested and held at La Force Prison. He was freed during the Malet coup of 1812, but after the coup's failure he was recaptured and executed.

References

Sources
 

1766 births
1812 deaths
French generals
French military personnel of the Napoleonic Wars
Executed French people
People executed by the First French Empire
People executed by France by firing squad
People from Mayenne
Executed people from Pays de la Loire